Sean Shepherd is an American composer based in New York City and Pittsburgh, Pennsylvania.  His work has been performed by major orchestras, ensembles, and performers across the United States, Europe, and Asia. Performances include those with the Boston Symphony Orchestra, the Cleveland Orchestra, the New York Philharmonic, the National Symphony Orchestra, the BBC Symphony Orchestra, and New World Symphony Orchestra, at festivals including the Aldeburgh Festival, Heidelberger Frühling, La Jolla Music Festival, Lucerne Festival, Santa Fe Chamber Music Festival, and Tanglewood, and with leading European ensembles including Ensemble Intercontemporain, the Scharoun Ensemble Berlin, the Asko|Schönberg Ensemble and the Birmingham Contemporary Music Group.

Early life and education

Shepherd was born in 1979  in Reno, Nevada.   He performed his undergraduate work at the Indiana University Jacobs School of Music, where he studied under David Dzubay and American composer Claude Baker.  His graduate work was completed at the Juilliard School, where he studied with American composer Robert Beaser, followed by doctoral studies under Puerto Rican Composer Roberto Sierra and American Composer Steven Stucky at Cornell University.

Career

In 2012, Shepherd was named the Kravis Emerging Composer of the New York Philharmonic.   Shepherd's "Blue Blazes" premiered with National Symphony Orchestra under the direction of Christoph Eschenbach in 2013.

In 2021, Shepherd's work was featured at the Tanglewood Music Festival and at the Santa Fe Chamber Music Festival.  His work was deemed a "season highlight" when performed at the Cabrillo Festival of Contemporary Music in 2021.

Shepherd served as a finalist judge in the 2021 Broadcast Music, Inc.'s 69th Annual Student Composer Awards.

He is currently a visiting assistant professor of composition at the University of Chicago.

Works

Orchestral 
 Blue Blazes, 2012
 Concerto for Ensemble, 2014-15
 Desert Garden, 2011
 Downtime, 2021
 Express Abstractionism, 2017
 Magiya, 2013
 Melt, 2018
 Silvery Rills, 2011
 Songs, 2013
 Sprout, 2021
 Tuolumne, 2012
 Wanderlust, 2009

Ensemble and Chamber Without Voices 
 Aperture in Shift, for violin, cello, and piano, 2006
 the birds are nervous, the birds are scattered, for clarinet, violin, and piano, 2008
 Blur, for ensemble, 2011
 Lumens, for ensemble, 2005
 Means of Escape, for violin, cello, and clarinet
 Metamorphoses, for ensemble, 2004
 Octet, for ensemble, 2008
 Old Instruments, for flute and percussion, 2021
 Quartet for Oboe and Strings, for oboe quartet, 2011
 Quintet, for chamber ensemble 2013
 String Quartet No. 1, for string quartet, 2005
 String Quartet No. 2, for string quartet, 2015
 String Quartet No. 3, for string quartet, 2020
 Tiny Bright Big True Real, for oboe, bassoon, and piano, 2022
 Trio, for piano trio, 2012
 Twilight, for bassoon and string quartet, 2001
 Vignette: Four Vinaigrettes, for woodwind quintet, 2003/05
 Wanderlust - Seagulls on High, for large ensemble, 2007

Ensemble and Chamber With Voices 
 New Poems - 1907, mezzo-soprano and ensemble, 2002-03
 Ozymandias, for solo voices SATB, string quartet, and clarinet, 2005

Instrumental 
 Dust, for violin and piano, 2008
 Echo, for oboe, 2017
 familiar, for cello, 2022
 ribboned/braided/spun, for harp, 2014
 wideOPENwide, for violin, 2016

Chamber Orchestra 
 These Particular Circumstances, 2009

Choral 
 The Daffodils, 2013

Piano 
 Preludes, 2005-06

Solo Instrument and Orchestra 
 On a Clear Day, Cello

References

1979 births
People from Reno, Nevada
American composers
Indiana University alumni
Cornell University alumni
Living people